The 1965 Oregon State Beavers football team represented Oregon State University in the Athletic Association of Western Universities (AAWU) during the 1965 NCAA University Division football season. In their first season under head coach Dee Andros, the Beavers compiled a 5–5 record (1–3 in AAWU, seventh), and were outscored 162 to 125. They had only three home games, two on campus at Parker Stadium in Corvallis and one at Multnomah Stadium in Portland.

After ten seasons and a recent Rose Bowl appearance, head coach Tommy Prothro departed for UCLA in January 1965, and forty-year-old Andros was hired in early February. A Marine in World War II, he was the head coach at Idaho  and had played college football as a guard at Oklahoma in the late 1940s under head coach Bud Wilkinson. Andros led OSU for eleven years, through 1975, compiling a  record,  in AAWU/Pac-8), then was the athletic director until 1985.

The Beavers defeated rival Oregon for a second consecutive year, this time on the road. It was the first of seven straight wins for Andros in the Civil War game.

Schedule

Roster
QB Paul Brothers, Jr.
RB Bob Grim, Jr.
RB Pete Pifer, Jr.
Skip Vanderbrundt, So. (defense)

References

External links
 WSU Libraries: Game video – Washington State at Oregon State – October 30, 1965

Oregon State
Oregon State Beavers football seasons
Oregon State Beavers football